Arthur L. Carter (born December 24, 1931) is an American investment banker, publisher, and artist.

Biography
Born to a Jewish family, Carter graduated from Brown University in 1953 with a degree in French literature.
He served in the Coast Guard from 1953 to 1956 
He worked for Lehman Brothers for a period of time, but after taking a break to study at Dartmouth's Tuck School of Business, he started Carter, Berlind, & Weill in 1960, which eventually grew into Shearson Loeb Rhoades, later merging with Lehman to form Shearson Lehman Brothers.

After ten years, he sold his stake in Carter Berlind and tried his hand at several other businesses. Eventually, deciding that he wanted to run a newspaper, he started the Litchfield County Times, when no existing paper met his criteria. In December 1985, he was able to buy a controlling stake in The Nation. In 1987, he founded the weekly paper The New York Observer, which covered New York culture and politics. In 1995, he sold The Nation, in 2001, he sold the Litchfield County Times, and he sold The Observer in 2006.

In 2008, New York University renamed its journalism department the Arthur L. Carter Journalism Institute. Carter had previously taught at NYU as an adjunct professor of philosophy and journalism.

Personal life
He has three children: Jon Carter, Whendy Carter and Ellen Carter from his first marriage to Linda Schweitzer. In 1967, he married actress Dixie Carter, with whom he had two daughters, Ginna and Mary Dixie. They divorced 10 years later. He has been married to Dr. Linda Carter since 1980. His stepdaughter is actress Ali Marsh, whose husband is actor Fred Weller. He has 12 grandchildren.

He is also an artist: his paintings and sculptures have been exhibited in Tennessee, Rhode Island, and Paris, among other places.

References

1931 births
Living people
American investors
American bankers
20th-century American Jews
The Nation (U.S. magazine) people
Brown University alumni
Tuck School of Business alumni
Lehman Brothers people
The New York Observer people
New York University faculty
Businesspeople from New York City
20th-century American newspaper founders
20th-century American businesspeople
21st-century American Jews